Dan Daly (1864 – March 26, 1904) was an American actor known as the "eccentric comedian". He was born in 1864 in Revere, Massachusetts as the youngest son. His siblings were Thomas Daly, William Daly, Lucy Daly, Maggie Daly, and Robert Daly.

In 1896 he appeared in The Lady Slavey in New York co-starring Marie Dressler. In 1901 he appeared with Edna May in The Girl From Up There.

He contracted tuberculosis. He married Mary Mooney of Boston, and they had a son, Dan Daly. Mary died around March 20, 1904. He died on March 26, 1904, at the age of 40, from a pulmonary hemorrhage at the Hotel Veldome in Manhattan.

According to fellow comedian Eddie Foy Sr., Daly subsisted on a diet of snails and champagne for the last two years of his life:

References

External links

 
 
 "Dan Daly at the Museum". The Cambridge Tribune. May 17, 1902.

1864 births
1904 deaths
19th-century American male actors
20th-century American comedians
20th-century American male actors
20th-century deaths from tuberculosis
American male comedians
American male stage actors
Deaths from pulmonary hemorrhage
Male actors from Massachusetts
People from Revere, Massachusetts
Tuberculosis deaths in New York (state)
19th-century American comedians